Sumağallı (also, Sumaqallı, Sumagally, and Sumakhly) is a village and municipality in the Ismailli Rayon of Azerbaijan. It has a population of 734.

References 

Populated places in Ismayilli District